Acraea vesperalis, the rare musanga acraea, is a butterfly in the family Nymphalidae. It is found in Guinea, Sierra Leone, Ivory Coast, Ghana, Nigeria, Cameroon, the Republic of the Congo, the Central African Republic, the Democratic Republic of the Congo and Uganda.

Description

A. vesperalis Smith (56 f). Fore wing broadly darkened at the apex and distal margin, semitransparent and with distinct dark transverse bands. Hind wing above light ochre-yellow with black-brown marginal band about 4 mm. in breadth, beneath dark ochre-yellow with long dark streaks on the interneural folds. Sierra Leone to the Congo and Uganda. -  catori Beth. Baker. Ground-colour of the hindwing light yellow. Sierra 
Leone.

Biology
The habitat consists of forests.

The larvae feed on Musanga and Myrianthus species.

Taxonomy
It is a member of the Acraea pentapolis species group.-   but see also Pierre & Bernaud, 2014

References

External links

Die Gross-Schmetterlinge der Erde 13: Die Afrikanischen Tagfalter. Plate XIII 56 f 
Images representing Acraea vesperalis at Bold

Butterflies described in 1890
vesperalis
Butterflies of Africa